Miltiadis Papanikolaou, (born in the 1940s in Grevena, northern Greece), also known as Papanicolaou, is a Full Professor of History of Arts at the Philosophy department of the Aristotle University of Thessaloniki.

Papanikolaou was, from its inception in 1997 and until 2006, the Director of the State Museum of Contemporary Arts (SMCA) in Thessaloniki, Greece. During his position at the SMCA, Papanikolaou was the supervisor of the renowned Costakis collection, part of which is exposed at the Museum. He studied in universities in both Greece and Germany and published numerous books and reviews on contemporary art issues. He represented Greece in many international congresses and exhibitions in all over the world.

Miltiadis Papanikolaou was a candidate for the position of Vice-Chancellor during the internal elections at the Aristotle University of Thessaloniki in 2006.

External links
 History of Arts Department, Aristotle University of Thessaloniki
 Foundation of the SMCA - Official website

Living people
Academic staff of the Aristotle University of Thessaloniki
1947 births
People from Grevena